MLSE may refer to:

 Maple Leaf Sports & Entertainment, owner and operator of several Toronto-based sports teams
 Maximum likelihood sequence estimation, an algorithm